Brian Chapple (born 1945, London) is a British composer, who has won accolades such as the BBC Monarchy 1000 prize and has been featured on the BBC Proms. He was educated at Highgate School and studied at the Royal Academy of Music with Lennox Berkeley.

Chapple's 'Hymn to God the Father', which was commissioned by Wells Cathedral for its new music festival 2014, was premiered by the Cathedral Choir on 13 May 2014.

Compositions include
Green and Pleasant, prize-winning entry for the BBC Monarchy 1000 prize in 1973
Scherzos for four pianos
Choral symphony In Ecclesiis
Piano Concerto
In The Pink
Venus Fly Trap
Keeping Busy
Missa Brevis
Tango
Little Symphony
Lamentations of Jeremiah
Ave Verum Corpus 
Cantica
Magnificat
Songs of Innocence
In Memoriam
Three Motets
Five Blake Songs
Five Shakespeare Songs
Five volumes of piano pieces: In the Pink, Lazy Days, On the Cool Side, Swing's The Thing, Home and Dry
Bagatelles Diverses
Six Bagatelles for organ
Three Sacred Pieces
Ecce lignum crucis
St Paul's Service
Burlesque
Missa Brevis Exoniensis
What Child is this?
Safe where I cannot lie yet
Praeludiana for Organ (1973)

References

English composers
1945 births
Living people
People educated at Highgate School
Alumni of the Royal Academy of Music